Vilmos Tóth de Székel (28 May 1832 – 14 June 1898) was a Hungarian politician, who served as Interior Minister between 1871 and 1873.

References
 Országgyűlési Emlékkönyv 1866–1867, Pest, 1867 p. 406-408

1832 births
1898 deaths
People from Sečanj
Hungarians in Vojvodina
Hungarian Interior Ministers
Speakers of the House of Magnates